A shoggoth (occasionally shaggoth) is a fictional monster in the Cthulhu Mythos. The beings were mentioned in passing in H. P. Lovecraft's sonnet cycle Fungi from Yuggoth (1929–30) and later described in detail in his novella At the Mountains of Madness (1931).

Description

The definitive descriptions of shoggoths come from the above-quoted story. In it, Lovecraft describes them as massive amoeba-like creatures made out of iridescent black slime, with multiple eyes "floating" on the surface. They are "protoplasmic", lacking any default body shape and instead being able to form limbs and organs at will. A typical shoggoth measures 15 feet across when a sphere, though the story mentions the existence of others of much greater size. Being amorphous, shoggoths can take on any shape needed, making them very versatile within aquatic environments.

Cthulhu Mythos media most commonly portray shoggoths as intelligent to some degree, but deal with problems using only their great size and strength. The shoggoth that appears in At the Mountains of Madness simply rolls over and crushes numerous giant penguins that are in its way as it pursues human characters.

The character Abdul Alhazred is terrified by the mere idea of shoggoths' existence on Earth.

The shoggoths bear a strong physical resemblance to Ubbo-Sathla, a god-like entity supposedly responsible for the origin of life on Earth in the Hyperborean cycle written by Clark Ashton Smith.

Fictional history
At the Mountains of Madness includes a detailed account of the circumstances of the shoggoths' creation by the extraterrestrial Elder Things. Shoggoths were initially used to build the cities of their masters. Though able to "understand" the Elder Things' language, shoggoths had no real consciousness and were controlled through hypnotic suggestion. Over millions of years of existence, some shoggoths mutated, developed independent minds, and rebelled. The Elder Things succeeded in quelling the insurrection, but exterminating the shoggoths was not an option as the Elder Things were dependent on them for labor and had long lost their capacity to create new life. Shoggoths also developed the ability to survive on land, while the Elder Things retreated to the oceans. Shoggoths that remained alive in the abandoned Elder Thing city in Antarctica would later poorly imitate their masters' art and voices, endlessly repeating "Tekeli-li" or "Takkeli", a cry that their old masters used.

Notes

References
 
 
  Definitive version.
 

Cthulhu Mythos species
Fictional amorphous creatures
Fictional extraterrestrial characters
Fictional extraterrestrial life forms
Fictional genetically engineered characters
Fictional monsters
Literary characters introduced in 1930
Literary villains